Verbena is a genus of plants in the family Verbenaceae

Verbena may also refer to:

Plants
 Of the family Verbenaceae:
 Lemon verbena, Aloysia citrodora
 Mock verbenas, genus Glandularia
 Pineapple verbena, Nashia inaguensis
 Shrub verbenas, genus Lantana
 Other families:
 Sand-verbenas, genus Abronia
 Sweet verbena-tree or -myrtle, Backhousia citriodora

Places
 Verbena, Alabama, a historic district listed on the National Register of Historic Places in Chilton County, Alabama
 Verbena, Dublin a suburban area on the northside of Dublin
 Verbena Heights, a public housing estate in Tseung Kwan O, Hong Kong
 Verbena, a planet in the Firefly universe
 St. Verbena, a chapel in Dawn of the Dead (2004 film)

People
Verbena is a somewhat uncommon given name or a family name:
 Verbena, the character of Una Merkel in The Parent Trap (1961 film)
 Verbena, a character in Ray Billingsley's Curtis (comic strip)
 Dr. Verbena Beeks, a character from Quantum Leap played by Candy Brown Houston
 Verbena Singlefoot, a character in the 1925 movie Should Sailors Marry? played by Fay Holderness
 Alvaro Verbena, mayor of Deruta, Italy

Other
 Verbena (band), a rock band from Alabama
 Verbena (fair), a country fair or dance party, especially one held at night, in Spanish-speaking cultures
 Verbena (Mage: the Ascension), a tradition from the role-playing game Mage: The Ascension
 La verbena de la Paloma, 1894 zarzuela by Tomás Bretón
 La Verbena, a 1927 painting by Maruja Mallo
 Verbena (English title: Madrid Carnival), 1941 film by Edgar Neville
 Verbena, a 2002 novel by Nanci Kincaid
 HMS Verbena (1915), a Royal Navy Arabis-class sloop
 HMS Verbena (K85), a Royal Navy Group 1 Flower-class corvette
 USS Verbena (1864), a US Navy vessel
 "Verbena Academy" (バーベナ学園, Bābena Gakuen) in the computer game Shuffle!
 "Canto della Verbena", commonly "la Verbena", a traditional song from Siena, Italy
 The Charadio: Verbena Academy Broadcasting Department Shuffle! musical albums
 Verbena Consulting, a member of the Open Knowledge Initiative